South Korea participated at the 2018 Asian Para Games which was held in Jakarta, Indonesia from 6 to 13 October 2018. The South Korean delegation was led by chef de mission Jun Min-sik, and composed of 307 people, which included 201 athletes. Korean Paralympic Committee (KPC) aims to finish third at the event with 33 gold, 43 silver and 49 bronze medals. South Korea marched along with North Korea under the Korean Unification Flag at the opening ceremony, and have together fielded unified Korean teams in men's table tennis team and the men's swimming freestyle relay and medley relay events.

Medals by sport

See also
 South Korea at the 2018 Asian Games

References

Nations at the 2018 Asian Para Games
2018 in South Korean sport
South Korea at the Asian Para Games